The Division "Vittorio Veneto"  is one of three active divisions of the Italian Army. The division is based in Florence in Tuscany and part of the Northern Operational Forces Command. The division carries on the name and traditions of the Cold War Italian Army Armored Brigade "Vittorio Veneto". Brigade and division were named for the decisive Italian World War I victory at the Battle of Vittorio Veneto.

History 
In 2002 the Italian Army raised three division commands, with one of the three always readily deployable for NATO missions. The army decided that each division should carry on the traditions of one of the divisions that served with distinction during World War II. Therefore, on 31 December 2002 the 2nd Italian Division based in Vittorio Veneto was renamed Division Command "Mantova".

In the 2013 the army began a reform, which included the plan to merge the Airmobile Brigade "Friuli" into the Cavalry Brigade "Pozzuolo del Friuli". As the "Friuli" was one of the most distinguished units of the Italian Co-belligerent Army the army transferred the Division Command "Mantova" from Vittorio Veneto to Florence on 16 July 2013 concurrently renamed it as Division "Friuli", with the division receiving all the honors and traditions of the name "Friuli".

However, due to the Russian military intervention in Ukraine in 2014 the army's reform plans were reversed and an expansion of the army's forces began. As the Airmobile Brigade "Friuli" was no longer scheduled to merge into the Pozzuolo del Friuli the army renamed the Division "Friuli" as Division "Vittorio Veneto" on 1 July 2019, and on the same date all the honors and traditions of the name "Friuli" reverted to the brigade.

Organization 

Until 2022 the Division "Vittorio Veneto" commanded the following units in Northern Italy:

  Division "Vittorio Veneto", in Florence
  Command and Tactical Supports Unit "Vittorio Veneto", in Florence
  Cavalry Brigade "Pozzuolo del Friuli", in Gorizia
  Armored Brigade "Ariete", in Pordenone
  Paratroopers Brigade "Folgore", in Livorno

Since 2022 the division's only subordinate unit is the 78th Command and Tactical Supports Unit "Lupi di Toscana" in Florence.

  Division "Vittorio Veneto", in Florence
  78th Command and Tactical Supports Unit "Lupi di Toscana", in Florence
 Command Company
 Tactical and Logistic Support Battalion
 Deployment Support Company
 Transport Company

External links
 Italian Army Homepage: Division "Vittorio Veneto"

References 

Italian Army Divisions
Military units and formations established in 2019